The 1972 Kansas City Royals season was their fourth in Major League Baseball. The Royals finished fourth in the American League West at 76-78, 16 1/2 games behind the Oakland Athletics. John Mayberry, in his first season with Kansas City, led the team with 25 home runs and 100 runs batted in. Mayberry was the first Royals player to drive in at least 100 runs in a season.

Offseason 
 November 29, 1971: Steve Hovley was drafted by the Royals from the Oakland Athletics in the 1971 rule 5 draft.
 December 2, 1971: Jim York and Lance Clemons were traded by the Royals to the Houston Astros for John Mayberry and Dave Grangaard (minors).
 March 15, 1972: José Martínez was purchased by the Royals from the Pittsburgh Pirates.
 Prior to 1972 season: Mark Williams was signed as an amateur free agent by the Royals.

Regular season

Season standings

Record vs. opponents

Notable transactions 
 June 6, 1972: 1972 Major League Baseball draft
Jamie Quirk was drafted by the Royals in the 1st round (18th pick).
George Throop was drafted by the Royals in the 16th round.

Roster

Player stats

Batting

Starters by position 
Note: Pos = Position; G = Games played; AB = At bats; H = Hits; Avg. = Batting average; HR = Home runs; RBI = Runs batted in

Other batters 
Note: G = Games played; AB = At bats; H = Hits; Avg. = Batting average; HR = Home runs; RBI = Runs batted in

Pitching

Starting pitchers 
Note: G = Games pitched; IP = Innings pitched; W = Wins; L = Losses; ERA = Earned run average; SO = Strikeouts

Other pitchers 
Note: G = Games pitched; IP = Innings pitched; W = Wins; L = Losses; ERA = Earned run average; SO = Strikeouts

Relief pitchers 
Note: G = Games pitched; W = Wins; L = Losses; SV = Saves; ERA = Earned run average; SO = Strikeouts

Farm system 

LEAGUE CHAMPIONS: Billings

Notes

References 

1972 Kansas City Royals at Baseball Reference
1972 Kansas City Royals at Baseball Almanac

Kansas City Royals seasons
Kansas City Royals season
Kansas City